The River Grizedale, also known as Grizedale Beck, is a river in Lancashire, England.

The river rises at Grizedale Head between Abbeystead Fell, Cabin Flat and Dunkenshaw Fell and flows southwards, picking up several small streams on its way to join the Tarnbrook Wyre near Abbeystead. Grizedale Beck is used as a nursery for juvenile salmon and trout. It connects to the Grizedale Reservoir.

See also
Grizedale Bridge

References 

Rivers of Lancashire
Rivers of Lancaster
2Grizedale